The official results of the Women's Pole Vault event at the 1999 World Championships in Sevilla, Spain, held on Saturday August 21, 1999. The event was for the first time inducted into the World Outdoor Championships.

Medalists

Schedule
All times are Central European Time (UTC+1)

Records

Final

See also
 1998 Women's European Championships Pole Vault (Budapest)
 2000 Women's Olympic Pole Vault (Sydney)
 2002 Women's European Championships Pole Vault (Munich)

References

 IAAF Results
 Results

P
Pole vault at the World Athletics Championships
1999 in women's athletics